
 
 

Kangaroo Inn is a locality in the Australian state of South Australia located in the state's south-east within the Limestone Coast region about  south-east of the state capital of Adelaide, and about  south-east and about  north-west respectively of the municipal seats of Robe and Millicent.

Boundaries for the locality were created for “the long established name” on 18 December 1997.

Kangaroo Inn has a triangular shape due to being bounded by the Princes Highway to the south-west, the Clay Wells Road (also known as Beachport-Penola Road) to the north-east and Drain M of the Upper South East Drainage Network on its south-east side.

The land use within the locality is zoned as ‘primary production’.  The Kangaroo Inn Area School, a state government school which opened in 1963, is located in the locality’s south-east corner overlooking Clay Wells Road.

The 2016 Australian census which was conducted in August 2016 reports that Kangaroo Inn had a population of zero.

Kangaroo Inn is located within the federal division of Barker, the state electoral district of MacKillop and the local government areas of the District Council of Robe and the Wattle Range Council.

References
Notes

Citations

 

Towns in South Australia
Limestone Coast